Liam Hartnett (born 1963) is an Irish former Gaelic footballer who played for the Dr. Crokes club and at inter-county level with the Kerry senior football team.

Playing career

Hartnett first played Gaelic football at juvenile and underage levels with the Dr. Crokes club in Killarney. He progressed to adult level and won a Kerry IFC title in 1985. Hartnett later won two Munster SCFC titles and was at full-back when Dr. Crokes beat Thomas Davis in the 1992 All-Ireland club final. 

Hartnett first appeared on the inter-county scene for Kerry as a member of the minor team in 1981. He never played with the under-21 team, however, he made his senior team during the 1984–85 league. Hartnett made his only championship appearance when he lined out at full-back in a Munster semi-final defeat of Limerick in 1989.

Management career

In retirement from playing, Hartnett became involved in team management and coaching. He was part of the Dr. Croke's management team when they won the Kerry SFC title in 2000.

Honours

Player

Dr Crokes
All-Ireland Senior Club Football Championship: 1992
Munster Senior Club Football Championship: 1990, 1991
Kerry Senior Football Championship: 1991
Kerry Intermediate Football Championship: 1985

Management

Dr Crokes
Kerry Senior Football Championship: 2000

References

1963 births
Living people
Dr Crokes Gaelic footballers
Kerry inter-county Gaelic footballers
Gaelic football managers